is a Commodore 64 video game by Ken Coates released in North America in 1984. A direct port for the Famicom was released in Japan in 1985 with the spelling changed to Dough Boy.

Doughboy is a nickname given to American soldiers during the First World War because they would often rush into battle while wearing white dust on them; this originated in the Mexican–American War of 1848 when they had to march through the deserts of northern Mexico.

Summary

The general idea of the game is that the player must rescue a POW from a POW camp.

Players can die by being shot, falling into water (by drowning), being blown up by a land mine, and being run over by a tank. Players are in possession of machine gun and can use dynamite as a way to attack the enemies. A strict time limit of 24 hours (five real-time minutes) is used in order to keep the pace of the game relatively brisk. After each round is completed, time is taken off the clock to make things more difficult.

References

1984 video games
Commodore 64 games
Nintendo Entertainment System games
Kemco games
Synapse Software games
Top-down video games
Video games developed in the United States
Multiplayer and single-player video games